Smartbond may refer to:

Smartbond (monetary system), a non-governmental, independent monetary system
Smart bond (finance), a financial bond instantiated in a smart contract